Balboa Avenue Transit Center is a San Diego Trolley station in San Diego, California. The station is located along Balboa Avenue between Interstate 5 and Morena Boulevard. Service began on November 21, 2021 after the completion of the Blue Line Mid-Coast Trolley extension project.

The City, with input from the Pacific Beach and Clairemont Mesa community planning groups, approved the Balboa Station Area Specific Plan in September 2019.

Artwork from the nearby former Home Savings and Loan building could be incorporated into the station. The Chase bank plans to demolish its building, built in 1977, with eight mosaics by Millard Sheets on the exterior.

Station layout 
There are two tracks, each served by a side platform.

References 

Blue Line (San Diego Trolley)
San Diego Trolley stations in San Diego
Railway stations in the United States opened in 2021